Alpha Adimai is a 2021 Indian Tamil-language crime thriller film directed by Jinovi and starring Vinod Varma, Arun Nagaraj, Kalki, and Eshwar.

Cast 
Vinod Varma as Dheeraj 
Arun Nagaraj as Vicky 
Kalki as Mayilsamy  
Eshwar as Ponnan 
 Jinovi

Reception  
Film critic Subhash K. Jha opined that "I felt the same way about the film. It is way too persistent and aggressive. As for thrills, there is a long sequence where the drug peddlers give the cops the slip. It is well shot and smartly executed". Thinkal Menon of OTT Play wrote that "Had the makers focused more on character detailing and technical output, the film would have been more gripping". Bobby Sing of The Free Press Journal stated that "Besides, this also deserves to be seen for its effective camerawork, crisp editing, and background score, contributing majorly to the film’s gripping impact. Having said that, it certainly would have been a new-age gem with a little more detailing of the characters exploring their criminal psyche".

References

External links 

2020s Tamil-language films
Indian crime thriller films
2021 crime thriller films